Senator Cornwell may refer to:

John J. Cornwell (1867–1953), West Virginia State Senate
William J. Cornwell (1809–1896), New York State Senate